Dinner Station is a ghost town in Elko County in the American state of Nevada. It was an important stop of several stagecoach routes in the north of Elko for many years.

History
Dinner Station was started with a wood building in the 1860s. This building was destroyed by a fire in 1884 and was replaced by a stone building. By 1900 it had a population of 40 inhabitants. By then the stage stop had lost its importance because of the birth of the automotive industry which spelled the end of Dinner as city and it became just a private residence.  A fire in 1991 destroyed the sole building, but it was restored in 1996.

Ghost towns in Elko County, Nevada
Ghost towns in Nevada
Stagecoach stations in Nevada